Time is the Key is the fourth album by Pierre Moerlen's Gong. It was released in late 1979 by Arista Records.

Featuring an all-instrumental jazz-driven sound, notable for the prominent use of vibraphone, it has little to do with the psychedelic space rock of Daevid Allen's Gong, even though the two bands share a common history.

It features the English jazz keyboard player Peter Lemer on most tracks, their only album to do so, and Allmusic notes that there is also a progressive rock influence on the album, especially on the first two track.

Track listing

Personnel
Pierre Moerlen's Gong
Pierre Moerlen – drums, vibraphone, gong, electravibe, marimba, glockenspiel, tympani, darbuka, synthesizers (7, 8)
Hansford Rowe – bass (3 - 11), acoustic guitar (5), bass synthesizer (11)
Bon Lozaga – guitar (3 - 11)
Former Pierre Moerlen's Gong
Allan Holdsworth – lead guitar (9 - 11)
Additional personnel
Darryl Way – violin (1)
Joe Kirby – acoustic bass (1, 2)
Peter Lemer – keyboards (3 - 11), including Polymoog (6 - 10)
Nico Ramsden – lead and rhythm guitar (8)

Produced by Pierre Moerlen

Production credits
 Engineering – John Rollo
 Mastering – Ray Staff at Trident
 Photography – Jay Myrdal and Sheila Rock
 Sleeve layout and design – Steve Ridgeway and Julie Harris
 Additional engineer – Brian Risner
 Studio co-ordination – Brian Risner

References

Macan, E. L., Macan, E. (1997). Rocking the Classics: English Progressive Rock and the Counterculture. Germany: Oxford University Press. p. 243

1979 albums
Gong (band) albums
Pierre Moerlen's Gong albums
Arista Records albums